Ricardo André Duarte Pires (born 24 October 1982 in Amadora, Lisbon) is a retired Portuguese footballer who played as a defensive midfielder.

Football career
After unsuccessfully emerging through S.L. Benfica's youth system – he only appeared for its B-side – André signed with F.C. Paços de Ferreira from the Primeira Liga in 2003, playing 15 games and suffering team relegation in his first season. After one more year he signed with Vitória de Setúbal's reserves, also in the third division as Benfica's second team.

André subsequently competed in the second level with Gondomar SC, then moved to Bulgaria in the 2007 summer by joining PFC Cherno More Varna. He made his competitive debut on 12 July, in a UEFA Intertoto Cup match against FK Makedonija Gjorče Petrov, playing the entire 4–0 win. On 28 August 2007 he scored his first goal for the club, but in a 1–3 loss to PFC Slavia Sofia.

In January 2010 André switched to PSFC Chernomorets Burgas, in the same country. He was released in July of the following year, retiring shortly after at the age of only 29.

References

External links

1982 births
Living people
People from Amadora
Portuguese footballers
Association football midfielders
Primeira Liga players
Liga Portugal 2 players
Segunda Divisão players
S.L. Benfica B players
F.C. Paços de Ferreira players
Gondomar S.C. players
First Professional Football League (Bulgaria) players
PFC Cherno More Varna players
PFC Chernomorets Burgas players
Portuguese expatriate footballers
Expatriate footballers in Bulgaria
Portuguese expatriate sportspeople in Bulgaria
Sportspeople from Lisbon District